Jil Tracy is a Republican member of the Illinois State Senate, representing the 47th District since January 11, 2017. The district covers a large swath of west-central Illinois, including all of Adams, Brown, Cass, Hancock, Henderson, Mason, McDonough, Schuyler, Warren counties and portions of Fulton and Knox counties. She was a former member of the Illinois House of Representatives, who represented the 93rd district from her appointment in July 2006 until 2015.

Legal career
Tracy graduated from Southern Illinois University School of Law in 1979. Tracy practiced law in the Mount Sterling area from 1980 to 1997. While in private practice, she served as the attorney for the City of Mt. Sterling, the Mt. Sterling Fire Protection District, and the villages of Ripley and Mounds Station. Tracy was appointed by Attorney General Jim Ryan in 1997 to serve as Illinois Assistant Attorney General and Director of the West Central Regional Office. She continued in that office under Attorney General Lisa Madigan until 2004.

Political career
As Illinois State Representative, Tracy's committee assignments were Consumer Protection, Local Government, Aging, Rural Economic Development, Higher Education, Juvenile Justice Reform, and Transportation & Motor Vehicles.

On September 3, 2013, Illinois gubernatorial candidate Kirk Dillard announced Tracy as his running mate.

In 2015, Tracy announced she was running for the 47th District State Senate seat being vacated by 14-year incumbent Democrat John M. Sullivan. Her House district covered the western portion of the Senate district. With Sullivan retiring, Tracy was a heavy favorite, given the 47th's strong Republican bent. She was unopposed in both the Republican primary and the general election. She was unopposed for a second term in 2018.

On December 3, 2015, she was named as an Illinois state co-chair of John Kasich's presidential campaign.

She currently serves on the following committees: Environment and Conservation (Minority Spokesperson); Judiciary (Minority Spokesperson); Agriculture; Criminal Law; Education; Ethics; Executive; Revenue; Judiciary- Property Law; Redistricting- West Central IL; Criminal Law- Special Issues; Sealing and Expungement; Executive- Liquor; Executive- Firearms.

Personal life
Tracy's husband, Jim, is the Senior Vice President, General Counsel, and Secretary of the Board of Directors of Dot Foods. Dot Foods was founded in 1960 by Jim Tracy's parents, Robert and Dorothy Tracy. Dot Foods is headquartered in Mt. Sterling, Illinois and is one of the largest food distribution companies in the nation.

Tracy lives in Quincy with her husband, Jim, and their four children.

References

External links
Representative Jil Tracy (R) 93rd District at the Illinois General Assembly
By session: 98th, 97th, 96th, 95th, 94th
State Representative Jil Tracy constituency site
 
Rep. Jil Tracy at Illinois House Republican Caucus
Dot Foods

Republican Party Illinois state senators
Republican Party members of the Illinois House of Representatives
Women state legislators in Illinois
1973 births
Living people
Southern Illinois University School of Law alumni
People from Mount Sterling, Illinois
21st-century American politicians
21st-century American women politicians